Maha Myat Muni Temple, also known as Wat Phra Sao Luang is a Buddhist temple in Kengtung, Shan State, Myanmar (Burma). The temple is known for its replica of the Mahamuni Buddha image in Mandalay.

The image was commissioned by the saopha (chieftain) of Kengtung State, Sao Kawng Kiao Intaleng, and the abbot of Wat Zaing Ngarm in 1920. A copy of the original image in Mandalay was cast in 1921 by U Tit and his workers, and installed and consecrated in 1926 in a new temple in Kengtung's town centre.

The Buddha image is subject to a face-washing ritual 2 to 3 times a month, similar to the image in Mandalay.

References 

Buddhist temples in Myanmar
Buildings and structures in Shan State
Religious buildings and structures completed in 1926
20th-century Buddhist temples